Group B of UEFA Women's Euro 2017 contained Germany, Italy, Russia and Sweden. The matches were played from 17 to 25 July 2017.

Teams

Standings

In the quarter-finals:
The winners of Group B, Germany, advance to play the runners-up of Group A, Denmark.
The runners-up of Group B, Sweden, advance to play the winners of Group A, Netherlands.

Matches
All times are local (UTC+2).

Italy vs Russia

Germany vs Sweden

Sweden vs Russia

Germany vs Italy

Russia vs Germany

Sweden vs Italy

References

External links
Official website

Group B